Tyjuan Cedric Hagler (born December 3, 1981) is a former American football linebacker for the Indianapolis Colts of the National Football League. He was drafted by the Colts in the fifth round of the 2005 NFL Draft and later won Super Bowl XLI with the team over the Chicago Bears. He played college football at Cincinnati.  
Hagler has also been a member of the Seattle Seahawks.

Early years
Hagler attended Bishop McNamara High School in Kankakee.  As a junior, he won first-team All-State honors, helped lead his team to a 13–1 record, and helped lead his team to second place in the state playoffs.  As a senior, he had 3 sacks and 61 tackles on defense, and rushed for over 1,400 yards and 25 touchdowns on offense.

Professional career

Indianapolis Colts
On November 4, 2009, it was reported that Hagler had suffered a ruptured biceps and would be on injured reserve for the rest of the season. Hagler contributed to the Colts' Super Bowl XLI victory over the Chicago Bears by recovering a fumble on a kickoff, fumbled by Gabe Reid.

Seattle Seahawks
Hagler signed with the Seattle Seahawks on August 10, 2010. He was waived at the end of training camp.

Second stint with Colts
Hagler re-signed with the Indianapolis Colts on September 29, 2010. He was waived on October 7, but re-signed with the Colts on October 10. During a key week 15 game against the Jacksonville Jaguars, Hagler returned an onside kick from Josh Scobee 41 yards for a touchdown. The Colts ended up winning the game, 34–24, controlling their own destiny from that point on by winning the AFC South crown.

References

External links
Hagler/HAG672748 Indianapolis Colts bio
 http://www.tyjuanhaglerfoundation.org

1981 births
Living people
Sportspeople from Kankakee, Illinois
Players of American football from Illinois
African-American players of American football
American football linebackers
Cincinnati Bearcats football players
Indianapolis Colts players
Seattle Seahawks players
21st-century African-American sportspeople
20th-century African-American people